Vanessa Marcil is an American actress. She is best known for her television roles as Brenda Barrett on  General Hospital, Gina Kincaid on Beverly Hills, 90210, and Sam Marquez on Las Vegas.

Early life
Marcil, the youngest of four children, was born in Indio, California, to Patricia Marcil, an herbalist, and Pete Ortiz, a contractor and self-made millionaire. Marcil's father is Mexican, and her mother is an American of French and Italian ancestry. Vanessa attended Indio High School, which is located in Indio, California. Shortly after high school, she attended College of the Desert, which is a junior college located in Palm Desert, California.

Career
Marcil acted in a number of theatre productions before landing the role of Brenda Barrett on the soap opera, General Hospital, in 1992. She garnered three Daytime Emmy Award nominations (in 1997, 1998, and 2003) for her portrayal, and she won in 2003 as Outstanding Supporting Actress. In February 1998, she was named Outstanding Lead Actress at the Soap Opera Digest Awards.

On June 14, 1993, she appeared in the Prince music video "Poorgoo,” which was officially released in very limited numbers. In 1994, she was cast in the Prince music video, "The Most Beautiful Girl in the World,” and she also made People'''s 50 Most Beautiful list the next year. She made her feature-film debut in the film, The Rock (1996), in which she appeared opposite Nicolas Cage, Sean Connery, and Ed Harris.

In 1998, after six years on General Hospital, she left the show to star in the made-for-television movie, To Love, Honor and Deceive and had a recurring guest role on the police drama High Incident, which was produced by Steven Spielberg. In November 1998, Marcil joined the Beverly Hills, 90210 cast as Gina Kincaid and remained with the show for one-and-a-half seasons. In 1999, she starred in two independent films: Nice Guys Sleep Alone, with Sean O'Bryan, and This Space Between Us, with Jeremy Sisto.

In 2001, she was initially cast to join NYPD Blues ninth season as a new series regular, Detective Carmen Olivera. However, after her first appearance in "Johnny Got His Gold,” the show decided to redo the role and replaced Marcil with Jacqueline Obradors, as Detective Rita Ortiz. Marcil made one more cameo appearance, as Detective Olivera, in the 11th-season episode, "Shear Stupidity.” 

From 2002 to 2003, she returned to General Hospital, as Brenda Barrett, garnering her a Daytime Emmy Award for Outstanding Supporting Actress in 2003. Vanessa later joined the cast of the NBC drama Las Vegas as Sam Marquez, a casino host, where she remained on the show for five seasons until 2008. That same year, she became the host of Lifetime's reality show Blush: The Search for the Next Great Makeup Artist, as well as making a three-episode guest appearance on the NBC show Lipstick Jungle.

In 2009, she starred in the Hallmark Channel movie The Nanny Express and in the Lifetime movie, One Hot Summer. In 2010, she was in the web series The Bannen Way, and in August 2010, after a seven-year absence, she made her return to General Hospital, remaining on the show for a year before her departure from the daytime series in July 2011. Marcil did reprise her role by making a guest appearance in April 2013, however, to commemorate the show's 50th anniversary.

In 2014, she starred in the Hallmark channel movie, Stranded in Paradise, and in 2015, she joined the cast of the Pop reality series, Queens of Drama, about the lives of former soap-opera actresses attempting to pitch a pilot for a television network. In 2016, she starred in her latest Hallmark channel movie, The Convenient Groom.

Personal life
Marcil was married to actor Corey Feldman from 1989 to 1993.

In 1999, Marcil started dating her Beverly Hills, 90210'' cast mate, Brian Austin Green, whom she met on set. The two became engaged in July 2001 and had a son named Kassius Lijah Marcil-Green. They planned to wed that year, but they ended their relationship in 2003.

On July 11, 2010, Marcil married actor Carmine Giovinazzo in a private ceremony in New York City. In June 2011, the couple announced they were expecting their first child together; however, Marcil suffered a miscarriage, her second that year. Marcil filed for divorce in August 2012 on the basis of irreconcilable differences. The divorce was finalized in March 2013.

In April 2015, Marcil revealed on social media that she was engaged to a California Deputy Sheriff, MC Martin. On November 13, 2017, Marcil announced she was pregnant again. On January 9, 2018, she revealed that she was expecting a daughter, but on January 27, released a statement on Instagram stating she had miscarried for the seventh time.

Marcil's father, Pete, died on September 14, 2017.

Marcil converted to Judaism.

Filmography

Awards and nominations

References

External links
 

Living people
Actresses from California
American film actresses
American soap opera actresses
American television actresses
American people of French descent
Hispanic and Latino American actresses
American people of Italian descent
American actresses of Mexican descent
People from Indio, California
Daytime Emmy Award winners
Daytime Emmy Award for Outstanding Supporting Actress in a Drama Series winners
20th-century American actresses
21st-century American actresses
Participants in American reality television series
Jewish American actresses
Converts to Judaism
21st-century American Jews
Year of birth missing (living people)